Daniela da Conceição Alexandre Reis (born 6 April 1993) is a Portuguese former racing cyclist, who rode professionally between 2017 and 2020 for UCI Women's Continental Teams  and . She rode at the 2014 UCI Road World Championships, and won nine national road titles at the elite level.

Major results
Source: 

2010
 National Junior Road Championships
1st  Time trial
2nd Road race
2011
 National Junior Road Championships
1st  Time trial
2nd Road race
2013
 National Road Championships
1st  Time trial
2nd Road race
2014
 2nd Road race, National Road Championships
2015
 National Road Championships
1st  Road race
1st  Time trial
 National Track Championships
1st  Points race
1st  Scratch
 3rd Scratch, Trofeu CAR Anadia Portugal
2016
 National Road Championships
1st  Road race
1st  Time trial
2018
 National Road Championships
1st  Road race
1st  Time trial
 Mediterranean Games
4th Road race
4th Time trial
2019
 National Road Championships
1st  Road race
1st  Time trial
 10th Overall Vuelta a Burgos Feminas

References

External links
 

1993 births
Living people
Portuguese female cyclists
Cyclists at the 2015 European Games
European Games competitors for Portugal
Cyclists at the 2019 European Games
Sportspeople from Lisbon District